VH1 Storytellers is a television music series produced by the VH1 network.

VH1 Storytellers may also refer to:
 VH1 Storytellers (Alicia Keys album), 2013
 VH1 Storytellers (David Bowie album), 2009
 VH1 Storytellers (Bruce Springsteen), 2005
 VH1 Storytellers: Johnny Cash & Willie Nelson, 1998
 VH1 Storytellers (Kanye West album), 2010
 VH1 Storytellers (Ringo Starr album), 1998
 VH1 Storytellers (Billy Idol album), 2002